Mpra, or Mpre, is an extinct language spoken in the village of Butei in central Ghana, located between the towns of Techiman and Tamale near the confluence of the Black and White Voltas. Mpra has been difficult to classify due to its divergent vocabulary. It is known only from a 70-word list given in a 1931 article. Blench (2007) considers it to be a possible language isolate. A poorly attested language spoken in the nearby village of Tuluwe, Mpur, may also turn out to be yet another language isolate. Both Butie and Tuluwe are located near the village of Mpaha.

Painter (1967) briefly states that " has died" and that the ethnic group ("the Nnyamase-mprɛ") have "become Nnyamase-Gonja"; he appears to regard it as having been a dialect of Gonja. However, this is based only on the numerals, which are clearly related to Gonja. The rest of the vocabulary is "hard to recognise" (Williamson & Blench, 2000:36). Blench (2010) presents it as a possible Kwa language; Blench (2012) notes that it "may either be an isolate with [Kwa] borrowings or a highly divergent branch of Kwa".

Bibliography
 Blench, Roger. 2010. "Why is Africa so Linguistically Undiverse?". Language Isolates in Africa workshop, Lyon, December 3–4
 Cardinall, A.W. 1931. "A survival". Gold Coast Review, V,1:193-197.
 Painter, Colin. 1967. "The Distribution of Guang in Ghana, and a Statistical Pre-Testing on Twenty-Five Idiolects," The Journal of West African Languages, Vol. 4, No. 1, Cambridge University Press, Ibadan, pp. 25–78.

References

External links
Blench, Roger (1999) Recent Field Work in Ghana: Report on Dompo and a note on Mpre.

Languages of Ghana
Unclassified languages of Africa
Languages extinct in the 20th century